Bindiya Aur Bandook is a Hindi action drama movie of Bollywood, directed by Shibu Mitra and produced by Joginder. This film was released in 1972 under the banner of Apollo International.

Plot

Cast
 Kiran Kumar as Shankar
 Asha Sachdev as Durga
 Raza Murad as Karan Singh
 Laxmi Chhaya
 Joginder
 Tun Tun
 Keshto Mukherjee

Soundtrack 
All songs were written by Gulshan Bawra.

"Chhori Loot Gayi Re, Tere Liye Sajna" - Asha Bhosle
"Kela Aane Aane" - Asha Bhosle
"Bindiya Lagaungi" - Asha Bhosle
"Najariya Jhuka Ke" - Asha Bhosle
"Title Music"

References

External links
 

1972 films
1970s action drama films
1970s Hindi-language films
Indian action drama films
Indian rape and revenge films
Films directed by Shibu Mitra
1972 drama films
Films scored by Sonik-Omi
Films about outlaws